Kasongo Lunda is a town and seat of Kasongo Lunda Territory, in the Kwango Province of the Democratic Republic of the Congo.
The town lies near the border with Angola to the east, here defined by the Kwango River.
As of 2012 the town was estimated to have a population of 23,820.

References

Populated places in Kwango